Rochinia crassa, also known as the inflated spiny crab, is a species of crab in the family Epialtidae.

Description
Rochinia crassa has a spiny, elongate-triancular carapace. The rostrum comprises two short, stout spines. The chelipeds are very long and thin, and in adults can be approximately four times the length of the carpace. The walking legs are also long and slender.

Distribution
This species is found in the western Atlantic including the Gulf of Mexico, and ranges from Nova Scotia, Canada in the north, to Massachusetts and Texas in United States waters. It also occurs from northern Cuba to Colombia and French Guiana.

Habitat
It lives in soft bottoms, in substrates of mud and sand at depths of between 66 and 1,216 metres. This species does not occur near vents or seep sites.

References

External links
 Image of juvenile and adult
Image of juvenile specimen
Image of adult specimen

Majoidea
Crustaceans of the Atlantic Ocean
Crustaceans described in 1879